Paduka is an ancient form of footwear in India, consisting of a sole with a post and knob which is positioned between the big and second toe. It has been historically worn in South Asia and Southeast Asia. Paduka exist in a variety of forms and materials. They might be made in the shape of actual feet, or of fish, for example, and have been made of wood, ivory and silver. They may be elaborately decorated, such as when used as part of a bride's trousseau, but could also be given as religious offerings or themselves be the object of veneration.

Although simple wooden padukas could be worn by common people, padukas of fine teak, ebony and sandalwood, inlaid with ivory or wire, were a mark of the wearer's high status. In the modern world, padukas are worn as footwear by mendicants and saints of Hinduism, Buddhism,and Jainism. Its significance in Hinduism is linked to the epic Ramayana. Paduka can also refer to the footprints of deities and saints that are venerated in symbolic form in houses and purpose-built temples. One such temple is the Vishnupad Mandir in Gaya, India. Similarly, Buddha footprints are worshipped under the Bodhi Tree in Bodh Gaya.

Paduka are the royal symbol in Malaysia. Seri Paduka denotes "His Majesty", which is a title bestowed as an honour of recognition to dignitaries of the Malaysian court.

Etymology 

The Sanskrit word pāduka is derivative of pāda meaning 'foot'. This terminology was coined to define India's ancient archetypal footwear.

Legends
The word pada ('foot') is cited in the ancient Hindu scripture Rigveda as representing the universe, namely the Prithvi (earth), Vayu (air), Akash (sky) and the element of the realm beyond the sky.

In the Hindu epic Ramayana, the cursed King Dasaratha sent his son Rama (an incarnation of god Vishnu) into exile for 14 years at the behest of his wife Kaikeyi (stepmother of Rama), who wanted her son Bharata to be crowned in Rama's place. However, Bharata did not wish to have the kingdom, and visited Rama in exile, beseeching him to return to Ayodhya. When Rama replied that he would return only after completing his exile, Bharata requested Rama's paduka to serve as his proxy, to be crowned and to serve as an object of veneration for Rama's followers. Bharata carried Rama's golden padukas with great reverence by placing them on his head as a mark of his obedience to his elder brother. Bharata ruled Kosala as Rama's proxy in the name of "Ram's Padukas".

Construction

The footwear is basically a sandal, which has generally a wooden sole with a post and a stub to provide grip between the big and second toes. It does not have straps of any kind to adhere the sole to the foot, so the wearer has to actively grip the post between the two toes to keep the sandal in place while walking.

It is also known as khadau, karrow, kharawan and karom, and used in the Indian subcontinent mostly by mendicants, saints and commoners. Made in the shape of the footprints, with two narrow and curved stilts, the design is specific to ensure that the principle of non-violence – practised by the saintly followers of Hindu and Jain religions – is not violated by accidental trampling of insects and vegetation. The Brahmins wearing such a paduka may be heard praying: "Forgive me Mother Earth the sin of injury, the violence I do, by placing my feet upon you this morning."

Padukas made of ivory were in popular use among royalty and saints. Hindu religious ethos requires that the ivory be taken from elephants which died naturally or harvested from domesticated elephants, in a manner which avoids cruelty. People of high societal status wear padukas made of fine teak, ebony and sandalwood and inlaid with ivory or wire. They are also made in the shape of fish as a symbol of fertility.

Other forms of padukas worn on special occasions may be incised with silver or of wood covered with silver plates and sometimes adorned with bells to sound upon walking. Bronze and brass padukas may be worn for ritual and ceremonial use.

A unique pair of wooden padukas have their toe knobs inlaid with ivory lotus flowers and are minutely painted. At each step, a trigger mechanism in the sole signals the lotus to open from bud to blossom. They are also made in the shape of an hourglass or with carved toes.

Eighteenth-century footwear used as ritual wear made of "wood with bed of sharp iron spikes" has been found. It is inferred that it was meant to be used to inflict pain to the wearer to demonstrate his conviction in religious forbearance of pain.

Veneration

Paduka is often gifted as part of a bride's dowry. They are worshipped and given as votive offerings by faithful believers.

In a festival associated with the Hindu god Vithoba, pilgrims travel to his Pandharpur temple from Alandi and Dehu towns that are closely associated with poet-saints Dnyaneshwar and Tukaram (respectively), carrying the padukas of the saints in a silver palkhi (palanquin).

A popular religious belief is of the contact (sparsh) with the salabhanjika sculpture yakshini's foot. It is said that when the yakshini encircles a dormant tree with her leg around it, it starts to blossom and bear fruit. Shalabhanjika yakshi is also an embellishment in the form of an architectural bracket in many Hindu temples.

Another notable feature of veneration is of the goddess Lakshmi, the goddess of prosperity. On Deepavali festival day, Lakshmi is devotionally ushered into the house through symbolic representation with a series of her footprints (paduka) drawn in paint or kolam and lit with oil lamps, from the main door to the private sanctum. This is done with the wish that good fortune shall be bestowed by her upon the householders.

Below the Bodhi tree at Bodh Gaya where Buddha received enlightenment, there is a vacant throne that is adorned with the foot prints on a foot rest of the Buddha. This place is deeply venerated.

Vishnupad temple

Vishnupada Mandir is said to enshrine the footprints of Vishnu. This footprint denotes the act of Vishnu subduing Gayasur by placing his foot on Gayasur's chest. Inside the temple, the  footprint is imprinted in solid rock and surrounded by a silver-plated octagonal enclosure. Within the temple precincts, the banyan tree called the 'Akshayabat' is located where the final rituals for the dead takes place.

Paduka Sahasram
Paduka Sahasram (literally meaning "1,000 verses on the padukas of the Lord") is devotional poetry extolling the virtues of worshipping the paduka (feet) of Vishnu, enshrined in Sri Ranganathaswamy Temple in Srirangam, Tamil Nadu. It is considered a sacred script of the Sri Sampradaya or Sri Vaishnavism. The Sahasram was composed in 1,008 verses in 32 chapters by Swami Vedantha Desika, a follower of the Vishishtadvaita philosophy. It is also said that Desika composed this as a challenge to his rival group of Tengalai Iyengars (who belonged to the southern school of the Srivaishnava philosophy) in one-quarter of a night. The eulogy of the Lord's Paduka centres around Rama's paduka, which ruled the kingdom of Ayodhya for 14 years. Desika propounds that it was due to the special relationship that people of Ayodhya had with Rama's paduka that they attained salvation in life.

Guru Paduka Sthothram
Adi Shankaracharya has also written nine devotional verses under the title "Guru Paduka Sthothram" as salutations to his guru (the Lord). An English translation of the first verse is:
Salutations and Salutations to the sandals of my Guru,
Which is a boat, which helps me, cross the endless ocean of life,
Which endows me, with the sense of devotion to my Guru,
And by worship of which, I attain the dominion of renunciation.

Satchidananda Utsav 
Satchidananda Utsav (celebration of truth, consciousness and bliss) is organised by Sadguru Shree Aniruddha Upasana Trust (Mumbai, India) and celebrated every year on the second Saturday of Margashirsha (the ninth month of the Hindu calendar). It is usually performed for two to five consecutive days. The holy padukas worshipped during the celebration are prepared from the paper pulp of Ram Naam books issued by Aniruddha's Universal Bank of Ram Naam and written by thousands of devotees across the world.

Gallery

See also
Upanah
Sandal
Chappal

References

External links
All about shoes: Padukas

Clogs (shoes)
Indian footwear
Hindu symbols